Theon may refer to:

 The Ancient Greek word for God or gods; see 
 Theon, Washington, a community in the United States
 Theon Junior (crater), a lunar impact crater
 Theon Senior (crater), a lunar impact crater
 Theon comes from the proto-greek word Eleon which held a similar understanding as the Hebrew word Elyown translated as "the being most high" or simply "the most high" with the influence of the Phonetician word Elioun meaning "the most high being of me",  so that Eleon held the meaning "the most high being", making the Greek word Theos simply meaning "most high"

People with the name

Given name or stage name
 Theon (1st century BC), literary critic and lexicographer
 Theon (rhetorician) (c. 500), teacher of Damascius
 Theon, vocalist for Lovex
 Theon of Alexandria (c. 335 – c. 405), a Greek astronomer and mathematician
 Theon of Samos, painter
 Theon of Smyrna (c. 70 – c. 135), philosopher and mathematician

Surname
 Aelius Theon (mid to late first century A.D.), teacher of rhetorics
 Alma Théon (1843–1908), clairvoyant and occultist
 Max Théon (1848–1927), kabbalist and occultist

See also

Theion (disambiguation)
Then (disambiguation)
Theon (disambiguation)
Thien (disambiguation) 
Thiên (disambiguation)
Thoen (name)
Thone (disambiguation)
Toen (disambiguation)